Thomas Carpenter (by 1520 – 1565 or later), of St. Pancras without the Walls, Chichester, Sussex, was an English politician.

Carpenter was a Member of Parliament for Arundel in 1547 and Chichester in March 1553, October 1553 and April 1554.

References

1565 deaths
People from Chichester
English MPs 1547–1552
English MPs 1553 (Edward VI)
English MPs 1553 (Mary I)
English MPs 1554
Year of birth uncertain